Jean-François Beauchemin (born 1960 in Drummondville, Quebec) is a Canadian writer from Quebec. He is most noted as a two-time nominee for the Governor General's Award for French-language fiction, receiving nominations at the 2008 Governor General's Awards for Ceci est mon corps and at the 2009 Governor General's Awards for Cette année s'envole ma jeunesse.

A graduate of the Université de Montréal, Beauchemin worked as a host and producer for Société Radio-Canada for many years. He published his first novel, Comme enfant je suis cuit, in 1998, and first attracted wider attention when his 2004 novel Le Jour des corneilles won the Prix Jean-Hamelin. However, around this time he suffered a serious illness which nearly killed him; he subsequently left Radio-Canada to recover and devote himself to full-time writing. La fabrication de l'aube, a philosophical novel about a man confronting his mortality, was published in 2006, and won the Prix des libraires du Québec in 2007.

La fabrication de l'aube was selected for the 2009 edition of Le Combat des livres, in which it was defended by actor Emmanuel Bilodeau. Le Jour des corneilles was adapted as an animated film, which was released in 2012.

Works

Fiction
 Comme enfant je suis cuit, 1998
 Garage Molinari, 1999
 Les Choses terrestres, 2001
 Le Petit Pont de la Louve, 2002
 Le Jour des corneilles, 2004
 Turkana Boy, 2004
 La Fabrication de l'aube, 2006
 Ceci est mon corps, 2008
 Cette année s'envole ma jeunesse, 2009
 Le Temps qui m'est donné, 2010
 Le Hasard et la Volonté, 2012
 Quelques pas dans l'éternité, 2013
 Une enfance mal fermée, 2014
 Objets trouvés dans la mémoire, 2015
 Le projet Éternité, 2016
 J'attends Joséphine, 2017
 Archives de la joie, 2018
 Sale temps pour les émotifs, 2019

Children's literature 
 Mon père est une chaise, 2001

Poetry 
 Voici nos pas sur la terre, 2006
 Quand les pierres se mirent à rêver, 2007
 Fardeaux de mésanges, 2013

Non-fiction
 Ici Radio-Canada: 50 ans de télévision française, 2002

References

1960 births
Living people
20th-century Canadian novelists
20th-century Canadian male writers
21st-century Canadian novelists
21st-century Canadian non-fiction writers
21st-century Canadian poets
21st-century Canadian short story writers
21st-century Canadian male writers
Canadian male novelists
Canadian male non-fiction writers
Canadian male short story writers
Canadian male poets
Canadian novelists in French
Canadian non-fiction writers in French
Canadian short story writers in French
Canadian poets in French
French Quebecers
People from Drummondville
Writers from Quebec